Sproxton is a village and civil parish in the Ryedale district of North Yorkshire, England. The village was founded by the Banks family who originated from the Barlow family who designed the original wooden Nelson Gates. The 1806 stone version serves as the southern entrance/exit to Duncombe Park. The Grade II listed structure is inscribed with "To the memory of Lord Viscount Nelson and the unparalleled gallant achievements of the British Navy" on the front and on the rear side is inscribed with "Lamented Hero! O price his conquering country grieved to pays o dear brought glories of Trafalgar Day!"

In the time of Edward the Confessor, Sproxton (Sprostune) was in the hands of three local noblemen, but by 1086 the land belonged to the crown. The name Sproxton itself derives from Sprok's farm or settlement with Sprok being a given name to who owned the farm.

The grade II listed church of St. Chad in the village is unusual in that it was originally built in the 17th century as the chapel of West Newton Grange and moved to the village brick by brick in 1879. It is also reputedly the smallest in North Yorkshire (in terms of attendance) as it has only nine pews.

The  wood at the eastern edge of the village was bought by the Woodland Trust in 2008, having previously been part of the Duncombe Park estate. In the 12th and 13th centuries, the wood was part of the deer park in the Helmsley area. The Woodland Trust refers to the site as Robson's Spring, but is it actually three woods named Ness Great Wood, Green Sykes and Robson's Spring.

Sproxton lies within the Helmsley ward of Ryedale District Council and the Kirkbymoorside electoral division of North Yorkshire County Council. For Westminster elections Sproxton comes under the Thirsk and Malton constituency, currently represented by Kevin Hollinrake, a Conservative who has been incumbent since May 2015.

References

External links

Villages in North Yorkshire
Civil parishes in North Yorkshire